Jérôme Inzerillo (born 15 February 1990, in Marseille) is a tennis player from France.

Inzerillo and Jonathan Eysseric were the 2007 US Open boys doubles champions as a sixth seed. In the semifinals, Inzerillo and Eysseric beat top-seeded Vladimir Ignatic and Roman Jebavý. In the final, they defeated Grigor Dimitrov and Vasek Pospisil.

In 2012 Inzerillo was ranked #354 in men's singles, the highest of his career.

In January 2019, the AP reported that Inzerillo was one of four French tennis professionals arrested in a large tennis-fixing ring. Up to 100 players were suspected of working for a syndicate led by 28-year old Grigor Sargsyan, known as the Maestro. Sargsyan was arrested and held in a Belgian jail. The scheme was organized via encrypted messages lesser ranked players in smaller tournaments where the prize money of smaller amounts.  Sargsyan employed people to place bets on matches at a small enough level to escape the notice of gambling watchdogs. Players would fix games, sets, or matches and receive 500 to 3000 Euros ($570–3400).

Junior Grand Slam finals

Doubles: 1 (1 title)

ATP Challenger and ITF Futures finals

Singles: 4 (3–1)

Doubles: 31 (14–17)

References

External links
 
 

French male tennis players
French people of Italian descent
Tennis players from Marseille
1990 births
Living people
US Open (tennis) junior champions
Grand Slam (tennis) champions in boys' doubles